The 1977 Talladega 500 was a NASCAR Winston Cup Series race that took place on August 7, 1977, at Talladega Superspeedway in Talladega, Alabama.

Background
Talladega Superspeedway, originally known as Alabama International Motor Superspeedway (AIMS), is a motorsports complex located north of Talladega, Alabama. It is located on the former Anniston Air Force Base in the small city of Lincoln. The track is a Tri-oval and was constructed by International Speedway Corporation, a business controlled by the France Family, in the 1960s. Talladega is most known for its steep banking and the unique location of the start/finish line - located just past the exit to pit road. The track currently hosts the NASCAR series such as the Sprint Cup Series, Xfinity Series, and the Camping World Truck Series.

Race report
Roger Penske withdrew his entry following fines to DiGard Racing, Bud Moore Engineering, the Junior Johnson team, the M.C. Anderson team, and Hoss Ellington's team; the fines came when NASCAR chief Bill Gazaway announced that an unnamed team was caught with an illegal fuel cell and an official watched members of the above-mentioned teams at garage pay phones calling for legal fuel cells. Hank Williams, Jr. served as the honorary starter of this race; joining a list of celebrities that came before and after him like Bart Starr and Will Ferrell.

Notable crew chiefs for this race included Tex Powell, Buddy Parrott, Jake Elder, Joey Arrington, Kirk Shelmerdine, Dale Inman, Harry Hyde, and Tim Brewer.

The race covered 188 laps on the paved oval spanning  on an atrociously hot weekend, and it was completed in three hours and four minutes with the lead changing hands 49 times among ten drivers. Donnie Allison (who would lead 92 laps overall) needed relief help after drinking a soda during a pitstop and falling ill soon after. Darrell Waltrip relieved Allison and defeated Cale Yarborough by less than a lap under the caution flag; Yarborough had only the high gear remaining his vehicle in addition to not having an attractive-looking ride. Cale Yarborough would re-take the points lead after this race while a NASCAR acolyte named Steve Moore would make his defining moment of his entire career by finishing in 19th place after qualifying in 40th place.

Sixty-five thousand people would attended. The race ended under a yellow flag.

Benny Parsons and Donnie Allison battled for the lead early; it changed twenty times. David Sisco allowed Bruce Hill to take over his car when he learned that his mother had been struck by a camper in the infield. The race continued under mainly green flag conditions, with engine failures taking out most of the competition.

Skip Manning would lead the only 13 laps in his Winston Cup Series career at this race. This was the only Talladega race without Dave Marcis entering until his retirement in 2002.

Most of the entries were Chevrolets. There were 39 males and one female participant (Ms. Janet Guthrie). Ms. Guthrie suffered an engine problem on lap 61 and did not finish the race. Country music star Marty Robbins did not qualify in his own vehicle; Freddy Fryar did that for him.

Qualifying

Finishing order
Section reference:

 Donnie Allison
 Cale Yarborough
 Skip Manning
 Ricky Rudd
 Lennie Pond
 Buddy Baker†
 Bobby Allison
 J.D. McDuffie†
 James Hylton†
 Frank Warren
 Richard Petty
 Buddy Arrington
 Harold Miller
 Tommy Gale†
 Grant Adcox*†
 Cecil Gordon†
 Dick May*†
 D.K. Ulrich
 Steve Moore*
 Richard Childress*
 Johnny Rutherford*
 Darrell Waltrip*
 Bill Elliott*
 Benny Parsons*†
 Neil Bonnett*†
 Sam Sommers*
 Tighe Scott*
 David Sisco*
 Butch Hartman*†
 Jim Raptis*
 G.C. Spencer*†
 Joe Mihalic*
 Peter Knab*
 Janet Guthrie*
 Bruce Hill*
 Jimmy Means*
 David Pearson*
 Marty Robbins*† (his engine froze during a pit stop)
 Dick Brooks*†
 Coo Coo Marlin*†

* Driver failed to finish race 
† signifies that the driver is known to be deceased

Standings after the race

References

Talladega
Talladega 500
NASCAR races at Talladega Superspeedway